The 1872 Preston by-election was fought on 13 September 1872.  The byelection was fought due to the death of one of the constituency's two Conservative MPs, Sir Thomas Fermor-Hesketh. It was won by the Conservative candidate John Holker.

References 

1872 elections in the United Kingdom
1872 in England
1870s in Lancashire
Elections in Preston
By-elections to the Parliament of the United Kingdom in Lancashire constituencies